Livingstone is a suburb in western Hamilton in New Zealand. J Livingstone, who the suburb is named after, owned and subdivided a large proportion of the area in 1916. The suburb became a part of Hamilton in 1962.

It is usually described as part of Nawton, Nawton Primary School is on Livingstone Avenue and it is in Nawton East census area.

References

See also
Suburbs of Hamilton, New Zealand

Suburbs of Hamilton, New Zealand